The Burt County Missouri River Bridge is a continuous truss bridge over the Missouri River connecting Burt County, Nebraska and Monona County, Iowa at Decatur, Nebraska. 
 
The bridge connects Nebraska Highway 51 and Iowa Highway 175. Interstate 29 is 7 miles east and Onawa, Iowa 8 miles east of the Missouri River.

The bridge was finished in 1951 and carried the first traffic in 1955 after the US Army Corps of Engineers diverted the river to flow under the bridge.  In late 2013, it became toll free under the joint ownership of the states of Nebraska and Iowa; up to that time, it had been one of three toll bridges in Nebraska.

Trivia

The bridge is known to the local population as "That Scary Ass Bridge" because of its loud, creaky ironwork, and the grillwork on the floor through which the river can be seen as you cross.

References

See also
List of crossings of the Missouri River

Continuous truss bridges in the United States
Road bridges in Nebraska
Buildings and structures in Burt County, Nebraska
Bridges over the Missouri River
Bridges in Monona County, Iowa
Road bridges in Iowa
Former toll bridges in Iowa
Former toll bridges in Nebraska
Bridges completed in 1951
1951 establishments in Iowa
1951 establishments in Nebraska
Interstate vehicle bridges in the United States